Whitsunday Miners Football Club were an Australian association football club based in Mackay, Queensland. They played in the Queensland State League and were founded in 2008.

History
Since being founded in 2008, the Whitsunday Miners have played in the Queensland State League, although success hasn't been strong for them, having two shaky seasons since their foundation. In the 2008 QSL competition, The Miners finished 9th out of 10 teams, finishing one point behind Logan United and just above Bundaberg Spirit. In the 2009 season they once more failed to make an impact on a longer season, finishing 10th out of 11, with Bundaberg Spirit finishing below them once more.

In the 2011 QSL season, the Miners have progressed to Round 2 of the QSL Finals after finishing third overall behind Sunshine Coast and Brisbane Strikers. The Whitsunday Miners knocked out Gold Coast Stars in 3–1 win at the new Mackay Stadium and now look to the Far North Queensland Bulls to play for a spot in the final.

Current squad

References

External links
 Home Page & Squad Profile

Queensland State League soccer teams
2008 establishments in Australia
Mining soccer clubs in Australia
Mackay, Queensland